This is the discography for Finnish folk metal band Korpiklaani.

Studio albums

Singles

Music videos

References 

Discographies of Finnish artists
Heavy metal group discographies